The Poarch Creek Indian Reservation is a Creek Indian reservation in the state of Alabama. It is the home of the Poarch Band of Creek Indians, the only federally recognized Native American tribe in the state.

The reservation is located eight miles (13 km) northwest of Atmore. Of the Poarch Band's 2,340 members, about 1,000 lived on or near the  reservation as of 2006. The Poarch Band also holds other trust lands in Alabama and Florida.

History
Despite the forced removal of Creek Indians from Georgia and Alabama in 1836, some Creeks in the Tensaw district of Alabama maintained a distinct community around the small town of Poarch, with segregated schools established by 1908. The federal government held a tract of land at Poarch in trust for the Indians until 1924. In the 1940s the community began to organize politically in its own interest, and from 1950 to 1970 tribal leader Calvin McGhee spearheaded a campaign for recognition of Creek land claims in the southeastern states. The Poarch Band raised funds largely through an annual Thanksgiving Day Pow Wow.

Established as a federal reservation in 1984, the Poarch Creek Indian Reservation is governed by a nine-member tribal council and provides police, fire, judicial, and social services. A "bingo palace" has been wholly owned by the tribal government since 1990, along with some small industrial plants and a restaurant and motel catering to tourists.

Demographics

The total population figure for the reservation lands in 2010 is 283. However, 282 persons reside in the Escambia County portion, while 1 individual lives on the Elmore County portion. The historical chart reflects those living exclusively in Escambia County.

External links
Poarch Band of Creek Indians
US Census Bureau's tract maps for Reservation 2865  (Poarch Creek)

References

Poarch Band of Creek Indians
Populated places in Escambia County, Alabama
Geography of Escambia County, Florida
Populated places established in 1984
Geography of Elmore County, Alabama
Landmarks in Alabama
American Indian reservations in Alabama
Geography of Montgomery County, Alabama
Geography of Monroe County, Alabama
1984 establishments in Alabama